Aly Badawy (born 1 January 2001) is an Egyptian sailor. He competed in the Laser event at the 2020 Summer Olympics.

References

External links
 
 

2001 births
Living people
Egyptian male sailors (sport)
Olympic sailors of Egypt
Sailors at the 2020 Summer Olympics – Laser
Sportspeople from Alexandria
21st-century Egyptian people